Killarney (Killarney Mountain Lodge) Water Aerodrome  is located adjacent to the town of Killarney, Ontario, Canada.

References

Registered aerodromes in Ontario
Seaplane bases in Ontario
Transport in Sudbury District
Buildings and structures in Sudbury District